Confédération Internationale de la Pêche Sportive  (CIPS) (English: International Confederation of Sport Fishing) which was founded in 1952 is the international sport federation representing a number of international federations concerned with angling sports that are carried out in fresh or seawater environments, fly fishing and with casting sport.

Organisation
CIPS was founded in Rome, Italy on 22 February 1952.

The CIPS is a confederation of the following international federations: 
Fédération Internationale de la Peche Sportive en Eaux Douce (FISP-ED) (English: International Fresh Water Sport Fishing Federation), 
Fédération Internationale de la Peche Sportive a la Mouche (FIPS-Mouche) (English:International Fly Sport Fishing Federation),
Fédération Internationale de la Pêche Sportive en Mer (FIPS-MER) (English: International Sea Sport Fishing Federation) and
Fédération Internationale du Lancer (ICSF) (English: International Casting Sport Federation).

CIPS via its constituent international federations is reported as representing 115 National Federations who in turn represent a total of 50 million individual members.  CIPS headquarters are located in Rome, Italy where its day-to-day operations are conducted.  World and continental championships are directly organised by its international federations.

Kindred organisations
CIPS is the predecessor of Confédération Mondiale des Activités Subaquatiques (CMAS) in respect to spearfishing.  CMAS was founded in 1959 by national federations which at the time were members of the Comité des Sports Sous-Marins (Underwater Sports Committee) of CIPS.

Recognition
CIPS is a member of SportAccord.  It is also one of the international sports federations that has agreed to comply with the World Anti-Doping Code which is overseen by the World Anti-Doping Agency.

See also
World Freshwater Angling Championships	
World Fly Fishing Championships

References

External links
CIPS website
International Fresh Water Sport Fishing Federation website 
International Federation of Sport Fly Fishing website 
 International Federation of Sport Fishing - Sea website
International Casting Sport Federation website

International sports organizations
Recreational fishing organizations